Alridge is a surname. Notable people with the surname include:

Anthony Alridge (born 1984), American football player
Waymon Alridge (born 1960), American football player

See also
Aldridge (surname)